Demolition Hammer is an American thrash metal band from the Bronx, New York, active from 1986 to 1995 and again since 2016. To date, the band has released three full-length studio albums: Tortured Existence (1991), Epidemic of Violence (1992) and Time Bomb (1994).

History

Formation and first two albums (1986–1992) 
Demolition Hammer arrived on the East Coast thrash metal scene circa 1986. The original lineup consisted of Steve Reynolds as the vocalist and on bass, James Reilly on guitar, and John Salerno on drums.  Their first demo tape, Skull Fracturing Nightmare, was released in 1988. It gained notice from fans of the genre and independent record labels. Derek Sykes was brought in as a second guitarist and Vincent Civitano (a.k.a. Vinny Daze) replaced Salerno. Their second demo, Necrology, secured the group a recording contract with Century Media Records.

Their first album Tortured Existence, produced by Scott Burns with a small budget, was released in early 1991. The songs were composed with fast riffs, chunky breakdowns, and expressive guitar solos. In 1992, the band released their critically acclaimed album Epidemic of Violence. The production was clearer and included faster and leaner songs. The covers of these first two releases featured horror based artwork and a logo designed by Daze.

Time Bomb and breakup (1993–2015) 

Fast-paced thrash metal became less popular in the '90s. Daze and Reilly left the band to form the group Deviate NY. Former Malevolent Creation drummer Alex Marquez joined Reynolds and Sykes to write material for another project. The label wished to release the songs with the band's original name. The result was the 1994 album Time Bomb with a new Demolition Hammer logo on the cover. It was slower and lacked guitar solos. The style was similar to that of groups like Pantera and Machine Head. After playing one of their final shows at Milwaukee MetalFest in the summer of 1995, Demolition Hammer broke up.

Marquez and Reynolds were offered new gigs with Solstice. Daze died of globefish poisoning while traveling in Africa on March 11, 1996. With Demolition Hammer's music becoming increasingly hard to come by, Century Media released Necrology: A Complete Anthology in 2008. It included every title from their first three albums, two pre-production demos from Time Bomb, and one video clip.

Reunion (2016–present) 
In March 2016, the band reunited with new drummer Angel Cotte. They played a show in June 2016 in Brooklyn, New York for which it was sold out under 3 minutes. They also played that year's Maryland Deathfest.

In a January 2017 interview at 70000 Tons of Metal, the members of Demolition Hammer were asked if the band will record a follow-up to 1994's Time Bomb. Bassist and vocalist Steve Reynolds replied, "We've talked. But we were so busy just trying to work all this in, we haven't really solidified any plans for that. But we're still talking about it." Guitarist James Reilly added, "Now that we see how well this is going, we do have it in our heads to start writing some new material and see where it goes."

Musical style 
In reference to a national tour in 1991, it was written that Demolition Hammer played "lightning-fast songs with complex structure and shifting rhythms." Another writer referred to Reynolds and Sykes as "riff machines" while also complimenting the band's songwriting ability. The band's sound is generally considered a fusion of thrash metal and death metal. The change of style towards a groove metal sound heard on Time Bomb drew ire from some fans of thrash metal.

Members 
 Steve Reynolds – bass, vocals (1986–1995, 2016–present)
 James Reilly – guitar, backing vocals (1986–1993, 2016–present)
 Derek Sykes – guitar, backing vocals (1988–1995, 2016–present)
 Angel Cotte – drums (2016–present)

Former
 John Salerno – drums (1986–1988)
 Vinny Daze – drums, backing vocals (1988–1993; died 1996)
 Alex Marquez – drums (1994–1995)

Touring Members
 Dennis Munoz – guitar (1995)
 Mike Usifer – guitar, backing vocals (1992)

Timeline

Discography

Studio albums 
 Tortured Existence (Century Media, 1991)
 Epidemic of Violence (Century Media, 1992)
 Time Bomb (Century Media, 1994)

Compilations 
 Necrology: A Complete Anthology (Century Media, 2008)

Demos 
 Skull Fracturing Nightmare (1988)
 Necrology (1989)

References

External links 

 Facebook

Musical groups established in 1986
Musical groups disestablished in 1995
Musical groups reestablished in 2016
American thrash metal musical groups
Death metal musical groups from New York (state)
Heavy metal musical groups from New York (state)
Musical groups from the Bronx
1986 establishments in New York City